Spike Brandt and Tony Cervone are an American television writing, animation and production team at Warner Bros. Animation and formerly at Nickelodeon Animation Studios. Brandt was born on December 24, 1961, in Milwaukee, Wisconsin, and Cervone was also born on November 15, 1966, in Melrose Park, Illinois.

The duo is best known for doing various projects about Scooby-Doo, The Flintstones, Tom and Jerry, and Looney Tunes. They had also worked on Animaniacs, Duck Dodgers, The Looney Tunes Show, and various other projects. Brandt had also voiced Spike Bulldog in various Tom and Jerry direct-to-DVD movies.

Early life 
Brandt was born on December 24, 1961, in Milwaukee, Wisconsin as Christopher John Brandt while Cervone was born on November 15, 1966, in Melrose Park, Illinois as Anthony Joseph Cervone.

Career

Beginnings
Both Brandt and Cervone started their careers in 1991. Brandt got his start in animation at StarToons, a prominent animation studio located in Chicago. Its founder, animator John McClenahan, had worked previously for studios among the likes of Hanna-Barbera. McClenahan hired Brandt because the studio needed some help animating episodes of Tiny Toon Adventures for Warner Bros. 

Brandt stayed for three years at StarToons, where he also worked on Warner Bros. shows like Taz-Mania and Animaniacs. It was during their shared tenure at StarToons that Brandt met fellow animator Tony Cervone, with them both serving as animation directors on Scooby-Doo! in Arabian Nights. Together, they would embark on a considerably long-lasting professional partnership.

Projects with Warner Bros.
The duo would go on to write, direct, and produce several projects for Warner Bros. starting in 1994, both together and solo. The Brandt-Cervone formula has proven to consist of revamping classic cartoon characters and series for contemporary audiences without compromising their original appeal.

They wrote, directed, and produced all episodes on Duck Dodgers (a re-imagining of a classic Daffy Duck segment) which aired from 2003 to 2005. Likewise, they were the developers, directors, and supervising producers of both Scooby-Doo! Mystery Incorporated and The Looney Tunes Show.

Brandt and Cervone would direct several Tom and Jerry direct-to-video films such as Tom and Jerry: A Nutcracker Tale and Tom and Jerry: Robin Hood and His Merry Mouse, also with other films having crossovers with the duo such as Willy Wonka and the Chocolate Factory and Sherlock Holmes. Brandt would also co-direct the 2005 short The Karate Guard alongside Tom and Jerry co-creator, Joseph Barbera. It was the last Tom and Jerry cartoon with Barbera’s involvement before his death on December 18, 2006, one year after the short aired in theaters.

The duo also produced and directed several Scooby-Doo projects, including the straight-to-video films Scooby-Doo! Abracadabra-Doo and Scooby-Doo! and Kiss: Rock and Roll Mystery. In 2018, Brandt directed the animation for an episode of Supernatural, which was a crossover with the characters of Scooby-Doo titled Scoobynatural. Cervone also directed several State Farm commercials featuring the Scooby-Doo characters.

Cervone served as the animation director for the 1996 film, Space Jam while Brandt directed the animation on its sequel, Space Jam: A New Legacy in 2021. Cervone went on to make his feature directorial debut with Scoob!, a film based on the Scooby-Doo franchise and was the first film of an Hanna-Barbera cinematic universe. He also provided the voice of a ghost and Mr. Rigby. It was released in 2020 and received mixed reviews. In 2021, Cervone announced that a sequel to the film was in development. Cervone also served as a consultant for Tom & Jerry.

Personal life 
Cervone married Allison Abbate in 2012. They have no children.

Filmography

Directors 
 1993: Animaniacs – 3 episodes (Spike Brandt)
 1994: Scooby-Doo! in Arabian Nights (Animation Director)
 1996: Space Jam (animation director) (Tony Cervone)
 2000: Little Go Beep (Spike Brandt) – Short
 2002: Baby Blues (Tony Cervone) – 1 episode
 2003–2005: Duck Dodgers – All episodes, Supervising Directors
 2004: Daffy Duck for President – Short
 2005: The Karate Guard (Spike Brandt; with Joseph Barbera) – Short
 2007: Tom and Jerry: A Nutcracker Tale – Film
 2007–2008: Tom and Jerry Tales – 4 episodes
 2008–2009: Back at the Barnyard – 4 episodes
 2010: Scooby-Doo! Abracadabra-Doo – Film
 2010: Tom and Jerry Meet Sherlock Holmes (Spike Brandt; with Jeff Siergey) – Film
 2011–2014: The Looney Tunes Show – 12 episodes
 2011: Tom and Jerry and the Wizard of Oz – Film
 2012: Tom and Jerry: Robin Hood and His Merry Mouse – Film
 2013: Tom and Jerry's Giant Adventure – Film
 2013: State Farm Scooby-Doo Commercials – 3 commercials (Tony Cervone)
 2014: Tom and Jerry: The Lost Dragon – Film
 2015: The Flintstones & WWE: Stone Age SmackDown! – Film
 2015: Tom and Jerry: Spy Quest – Film
 2015: Scooby-Doo! and Kiss: Rock and Roll Mystery – Film
 2016: Tom and Jerry: Back to Oz – Film
 2017: Tom and Jerry: Willy Wonka and the Chocolate Factory (Spike Brandt) – Film
 2018: Supernatural (Spike Brandt) – 1 episode, Animation Director
 2020: Scoob! (Tony Cervone) – Film
 2021: Space Jam: A New Legacy (animation director) (Spike Brandt)
 2021: Legends of Tomorrow (Tony Cervone) - 1 episode, animation supervisor

Writers 
 1995: The Cartoon Cartoon Show
 2003–2005: Duck Dodgers – 25 episodes
 2007: Tom and Jerry: A Nutcracker Tale – Film (screenplay only) (Spike Brandt)
 2007–2008: Tom and Jerry Tales – 4 episodes

Producers 
 2000: Little Go Beep – Producer (Spike Brandt)
 2003–2005: Duck Dodgers – Supervising Producers
 2004: Daffy Duck for President – Producers
 2005: The Karate Guard – Producers (with Joseph Barbera, Sam Register and Sander Schwartz)
 2007: Tom and Jerry: A Nutcracker Tale – Producers
 2007: Wacky Races Forever – Supervising Producers
 2010: Scooby-Doo! Abracadabra-Doo – Supervising Producers
 2010: Tom and Jerry Meet Sherlock Holmes – Producers (with Sam Register)
 2010–2013: Scooby-Doo! Mystery Incorporated – Supervising Producers
 2010: Scooby-Doo! Camp Scare – Producers
 2011: Scooby-Doo! Legend of the Phantosaur – Producers
 2011–2014: The Looney Tunes Show – Supervising Producers
 2011: I Tawt I Taw a Puddy Tat – Producers (with Greg Lyons)
 2012: Daffy's Rhapsody – Producers (with Greg Lyons)
 2012: Scooby-Doo! Music of the Vampire – Producers
 2012: Tom and Jerry: Robin Hood and His Merry Mouse – Producers
 2012: Big Top Scooby-Doo! – Producers
 2013: Tom and Jerry's Giant Adventure – Producers (with Sam Register)
 2014: Tom and Jerry: The Lost Dragon – Producers
 2015: The Flintstones & WWE: Stone Age SmackDown! – Producers (with Michael J. Luisi)
 2015: Tom and Jerry: Spy Quest – Producers
 2015: Scooby-Doo! and Kiss: Rock and Roll Mystery – Producers
 2016: Tom and Jerry: Back to Oz – Producers (with Sam Register)
 2017: Tom and Jerry: Willy Wonka and the Chocolate Factory – Producers (with Sam Register)
 2018: Supernatural (1 episode) – Animation Producer (Spike Brandt)
 2021: Scooby-Doo! The Sword and the Scoob – Producer (Spike Brandt)

Supervising producers 
 2003–2005: Duck Dodgers
 2007: Wacky Races Forever
 2010–2013: Scooby-Doo! Mystery Incorporated
 2011–2014: The Looney Tunes Show

Supervising directors 
 2003–2005: Duck Dodgers

Voice actors 
 2005: The Karate Guard (Brandt voiced Tom while Jill Talley voiced Jerry, and Cervone voiced Butch)
 2007: Tom and Jerry: A Nutcracker Tale (Brandt voiced Tom and Jerry, while Cervone voiced Butch)
 2010: Tom and Jerry Meet Sherlock Holmes (Brandt voiced Tom and Jerry)
 2010–2013: Scooby-Doo! Mystery Incorporated (Cervone voiced Gary in 6 episodes and French nerd in 1 episode)
 2011: Tom and Jerry and the Wizard of Oz (Brandt voiced Tom and Jerry)
 2012: Tom and Jerry: Robin Hood and His Merry Mouse (Brandt voiced Tom, Jerry and Tyke)
 2013: Tom and Jerry's Giant Adventure (Brandt voiced Tom, Jerry and Tyke)
 2014: Tom and Jerry: The Lost Dragon (Brandt voiced Tom and Jerry)
 2015: Tom and Jerry: Spy Quest (Brandt voiced Tom, Spike, Tyke and Bandit)
 2015: Scooby-Doo! and Kiss: Rock and Roll Mystery (Cervone voiced Announcer only)
 2016: Tom and Jerry: Back to Oz (Brandt voiced Tom, Jerry, and Spike)
 2017: Tom and Jerry: Willy Wonka and the Chocolate Factory (Brandt voiced Tom, Jerry and Spike)
 2020: Scoob! (Cervone voiced Ghost and Mr. Rigby)
 2021: Scooby-Doo! The Sword and the Scoob (Brandt voiced Mr. HB)

Voice directors 
 2004: Daffy Duck for President – Short

Storyboard artists 
 2001: Cats & Dogs
 2001: Shrek
 2003–2005: Duck Dodgers
 2008–2009: Back at the Barnyard
 2008–2009: Curious George (Spike Brandt)
 2009: Fantastic Mr. Fox (Tony Cervone)
 2010: Tom and Jerry Meet Sherlock Holmes
 2011: Tom and Jerry and the Wizard of Oz
 2012: Tom and Jerry: Robin Hood and His Merry Mouse
 2013: Tom and Jerry's Giant Adventure
 2014: Tom and Jerry: The Lost Dragon
 2015: Tom and Jerry: Spy Quest
 2016: Tom and Jerry: Back to Oz
 2017: Tom and Jerry: Willy Wonka and the Chocolate Factory

Designers 
 2010: Fuse Presents Z100's Jingle Ball

Assistant directors 
 1995: Carrotblanca

Animation directors 
 1991: Dudley's Classroom Adventure
 1996: Space Jam (just Tony Cervone)
 2018: Supernatural (episode "Scoobynatural") (Spike Brandt)
 2021: Space Jam: A New Legacy (Spike Brandt)

Lyrics 
 2007: Tom and Jerry: A Nutcracker Tale ("War Song for Children", "King of the Cats")
 2010: Scooby-Doo! Mystery Incorporated ("Trap of Love") (Tony Cervone)
 2015: Scooby-Doo! and Kiss: Rock and Roll Mystery ("Don't Touch My Ascot") (Tony Cervone)

Animators 
 1993: Animaniacs
 1996: Space Jam (Spike Brandt)
 2021: Space Jam: A New Legacy (Tony Cervone)

Consultants 
2021: Tom & Jerry (Tony Cervone)

References

External links 
 Spike Brandt at IMDb
 Tony Cervone at IMDb

American television directors
American television producers
American television writers
American male screenwriters
American male television writers
Living people
American film directors
American film producers
American lyricists
Animators from California
Animal impersonators
Place of birth missing (living people)
1961 births
1966 births
American storyboard artists
American male voice actors
American animated film directors
American animated film producers
American voice directors
Animation duos
Writing duos
Filmmaking duos
Warner Bros. people
Warner Bros. Cartoons people
Warner Bros. Animation people